The 2016 Milton Keynes Council election took place on 5 May 2016 to elect members of Milton Keynes Council in England. This was on the same day as other local elections.

Ward results

Two Councillors elected

Two Councillors were elected in the Bletchley East ward seat meaning each party was allowed to contest the seat with two candidates of their choice.

One Councillor elected

Only one candidate from each party could contest each seat.

References

2016 English local elections
2016
2010s in Buckinghamshire